Volcano plot may refer to:

 Sabatier principle - a concept in chemical catalysis that relates the optimal concentrations of catalysts and substrates
 Volcano plot (statistics) - a type of graph used to relate fold-change to p-value that is commonly used in genomics and other omic experiments involving thousands of data-points